Fish Springs is an unincorporated community in Carter County, Tennessee. Fish Springs is located along Watauga Lake.

History

The name Fish Springs originated before Watauga Lake was created.  It was given this name by early settlers because there was a large cavern system into which, via a relatively small opening, a part of the Watauga River flowed.  Fish in the Watauga river migrated into the cavern system in the Fall.  Each Spring the fish returned to the Watauga river via the opening.  Local residents could easily catch an abundance of Fish as they exited the Spring (as the opening to the cavern system was called).

Recreation
There are several recreational areas managed by the Cherokee National Forest in Fish Springs.
Cardens Bluff Campground
Shooks Branch Picnic Area and Swim Beach
Watauga Point Recreational Area

Fish Springs Marina
Fish Springs Marina and Campground offers boat rentals and sales, slip rentals and Camping. there is also the Marina Store and a Maintenance Dept.

See also
Watauga Lake

References

Unincorporated communities in Carter County, Tennessee
Unincorporated communities in Tennessee